Bruno Silva (born 14 April 1991) is a Brazilian professional footballer who plays as a forward for Campeonato Paulista Série A3 club União Suzano.

Career

PSIS Semarang
In 2018, Silva signed a contract with PSIS Semarang. He made his debut in a 1–4 home lost against Persija Jakarta on 20 April 2018.

Al-Ain Saudi
He joined Saudi Second Division club Al-Ain in January 2019.

Return to PSIS Semarang
On 16 September 2019, it was confirmed that Bruno would re-join PSIS Semarang, signing a year contract.

References

External links
Bruno Silva at Soccerway

1991 births
Living people
Footballers from São Paulo (state)
Brazilian footballers
Association football forwards
Clube Atlético Votuporanguense players
Botafogo Futebol Clube (SP) players
Associação Portuguesa de Desportos players
Agremiação Sportiva Arapiraquense players
PSIS Semarang players
Al-Ain FC (Saudi Arabia) players
Campeonato Brasileiro Série C players
Campeonato Brasileiro Série D players
Liga 1 (Indonesia) players
Saudi First Division League players
Brazilian expatriate footballers
Brazilian expatriate sportspeople in Indonesia
Brazilian expatriate sportspeople in Saudi Arabia
Expatriate footballers in Indonesia
Expatriate footballers in Saudi Arabia